Rajasthan State Industrial Development and Investment Corporation Ltd., popularly known as RIICO, is a premier agency of Government of Rajasthan that has played an important  role in the industrial development of Rajasthan. In 1980 RSIMDC split into RIICO & RSMDC.

RIICO is owned by Government of Rajasthan and it is an apex organisation of government of Rajasthan for development of industrial infrastructure within the state. RIICO is mainly engaged in site selection and acquisition of land, developing infrastructure for industrial area, financial assistance to small, medium and large-scale projects, equity participation in large projects on merit,
technical consultancy for project identification and technical tie up, escort services, facilitation of government clearances, extending incentives and concessions as per the policy of the State Government.

The corporation was incorporated on 28 March 1969 as RSIMDC and got its present name on 1 January 1980. It has 30 unit offices in Rajasthan  and has staff strength of about 800. More than 42300 industries are in production within the industrial areas developed by RIICO in Rajasthan

Shri Parsadi Lal, Hon'ble Minister of Industries & State Enterprises :
Shri Kuldeep Ranka, IAS, chairman, RIICO & Principal Secretary to CM :
Shri Ashutosh A.T. Pednekar, IAS, Secretary Industries & Managing Director RIICO

Top manufacturing companies in RIICO industrial area, Jaipur 

 Dibiaa- Cardboard box Manufacturer
 BKT Tyres
 RS Electrotech Private Limited
 DD Pharmaceuticals
 Kundu Brother
 Laxmi Rubber Industry
 Digilus Systems
 MICO
 Monad Electronics

References 
RIICO home page

Economy of Rajasthan
State agencies of Rajasthan
State industrial development corporations of India
1969 establishments in Rajasthan
Government agencies established in 1969